This is a list of airports in Denmark, sorted by location.

Denmark is a Scandinavian country in Northern Europe and the senior member of the Kingdom of Denmark. It is the southernmost of the Nordic countries, southwest of Sweden and south of Norway, and bordered to the south by Germany. Denmark borders both the Baltic and the North Sea.

The country consists of the large peninsula of Jutland (Jylland), as well as several hundred islands, most notably Zealand (Sjælland), Funen (Fyn), Vendsyssel-Thy, Lolland, Falster, Bornholm, and Amager. The capital and largest city of Denmark is Copenhagen (København), located on Amager and the east coast of Zealand.

Airports 

Airport names shown in bold have scheduled passenger service on commercial airlines.

See also 
 List of airports in the Faroe Islands
 List of airports in Greenland
 List of the largest airports in the Nordic countries
 Royal Danish Air Force
 Transport in Denmark
 List of airports by ICAO code: EK Denmark and the Faroe Islands
 Wikipedia: Airline destination lists: Europe#Denmark

References 
 
 
  - includes IATA codes

External links

 
Denmark
 
Denmark